IRNSS-1I is the eighth satellite in the Indian Regional Navigational Satellite System (IRNSS) series of satellites, in reality,  IRNSS - 1I is the ninth satellite that launched in IRNSS constellation but it is counting as eighth satellite because IRNSS - 1I is an eighth satellite that has launched successfully in IRNSS constellation. ISRO already launched IRNSS-1A, IRNSS-1B, IRNSS-1C, IRNSS-1D, IRNSS-1E, IRNSS-1F, IRNSS-1G and IRNSS-1H. The satellite is intended to replace the failed IRNSS-1A, and complete the constellation of geosynchronous navigation satellites after IRNSS-1H failed to do so. The satellite's assembly, integration and testing is partly done by a consortium of six small firms led by Alpha Design Technologies, a Bengaluru-based aerospace firm under URSC's supervision.

Payload
Like its predecessor, IRNSS-1I has two types of payloads, navigation payload and the ranging payload. The navigation payload transmits navigation service signals to the users. This payload is operating in L5 band and S band. A highly accurate Rubidium atomic clock is part of the navigation payload of the satellite. Failure of these Rubidium atomic clocks was the reason for IRNSS-1A to be deemed unfit. The ranging payload consists of transponder which is operated in CDMA mode for two-way range measurements. The IRNSS satellites continuously emits time stamped navigation signals, which are received by the ground-based user receivers. The information is then processed by the receivers to derive their own position, velocity and time. The system provides seamless, uninterrupted services under all weather conditions.

Satellite
The satellite will help in completing the satellite based navigation system of India which is currently under development. The IRNSS space segment consists of seven satellites. After the failure of all three Rubidium Atomic clocks on-board IRNSS-1A and the failure of IRNSS-1H to separate from the heat shield of the launch vehicle, IRNSS constellation remains incomplete without this satellite.  This independent regional navigation satellite system is developed by India and is similar to Global Positioning System (GPS) of the US, which has 31 satellites currently in orbit.

Launch
IRNSS-1I was successfully launched by 43rd flight of PSLV (PSLV-C41) in XL configuration on 11 April 2018.

See also

 Communication-Centric Intelligence Satellite (CCI-Sat)
 GPS-aided geo-augmented navigation (GAGAN)
 Satellite navigation

References

External links 
 ISRO Future Programmes

IRNSS satellites
Spacecraft launched by India in 2018
Spacecraft launched by PSLV rockets
April 2018 events in India